Trevor Hartley (born 16 March 1947) is an English former footballer with West Ham United and Bournemouth & Boscombe Athletic and football manager with AFC Bournemouth and Tottenham Hotspur.

Biography

Footballing career
Trevor Hartley was born in Doncaster, West Riding of Yorkshire. He joined West Ham United as a junior in 1966. He made his first-team debut in a 3–1 away defeat by West Bromwich Albion, on 28 April 1967. He made only five appearances for West Ham as a right winger between 1967 and 1969 before being transferred to Bournemouth & Boscombe Athletic where he made 42 appearances between 1969 and 1971 scoring two goals.

Managerial career
Between 1974 and 1975, he was manager at AFC Bournemouth. In 1986, he became David Pleat's Assistant Manager at Tottenham and when Pleat stood down in October 1987, he stood in as caretaker manager together with Doug Livermore who subsequently took charge, pending the arrival of Terry Venables in November that year. He later took charge of the national team of Malaysia between 1988 and 1990.

References

1947 births
Living people
Footballers from Doncaster
English footballers
English football managers
Tottenham Hotspur F.C. managers
West Ham United F.C. players
AFC Bournemouth players
English Football League players
Malaysia national football team managers
English Football League managers
Association football midfielders
Expatriate football managers in Malaysia
Expatriate football managers in Singapore
English expatriate football managers
AFC Bournemouth managers